Kaustubh Rawalnath Pawar (born 13 September 1990) is a cricketer who has played for Mumbai in Indian domestic cricket. He is a right-hand opening batsman and a right arm medium bowler.

References

External links 

Indian cricketers
Mumbai cricketers
West Zone cricketers
Living people
1990 births